George Poveromo is an angling authority, National Seminar host, television host, and Editor-At-Large for Salt Water Sportsman. 

Poveromo, a native of South Florida in the United States, has fished most of the U.S. coast as well as many countries. He demonstrates his expertise through his column "Tactics and Tackle" in Salt Water Sportsman. Poveromo is a member of the Outdoor Writers Association of America, Southeast Outdoor Press Association, and Boating Writers International. He is an advocate of catch and release fishing, and is a member of the Coastal Conservation Association.  He also serves as the offshore spokesperson for the Florida Coastal Conservation Association.

Poveromo is Editor-At-Large for Salt Water Sportsman magazine, the oldest and most widely distributed sport fishing magazine in the United States.  Salt Water Sportsman has a paid monthly circulation of over 150,000 readers. Poveromo has been part of the Salt Water staff since 1983.

In addition to Salt Water Sportsman, George has been the host of their National Seminar Series for all thirty-three years of the tour. The National Seminar Series, which has eight country-wide stops per year, instructs people on how to catch popular coastal and offshore game fish.  The Salt Water Sportsman National Seminar Series is the largest and most successful fishing seminar in the nation.

Most popularly noted would be George's television program, George Poveromo's World of Saltwater Fishing, which runs on the Discovery Channel.  The show, which aired on ESPN2 for 10 seasons was picked up by the NBC Sports Network, formerly Versus when ESPN cancelled its coverage of fishing.  It was then picked up by the Discovery Channel after airing for nine years on NBC Sports.The show is also now available to stream online via YouTube. Each week, Poveromo presents a cool and informative fishing episode from a U.S. coastal, or Bahamas fishing destination. Poveromo's show enters into its 21st season on national television in 2021.

Poveromo owns a Mako 334 Sportfish Edition named the MARC VI. The vessel is powered by triple 400hp Mercury Verado outboards and equipped with SIMRAD fish-finding electronics. Poveromo has long been a proponent of Mako boats.

Half-time around the year when George isn't filming or his show is not on TV, he does seminars in different states.

Poveromo is a graduate of the University of Miami and lives in Parkland, Florida with his wife, Edie. He has two daughters, Lindsay and Megan; the latter was featured in several episodes of George's television shows.

References

External links
 http://www.nationalseminarseries.com
 https://web.archive.org/web/20061205020208/http://highhookvideo.com/
 http://www.saltwatersportsman.com
 http://www.georgepoveromo.com

American fishers
American magazine editors
People from Coral Springs, Florida
Year of birth missing (living people)
Living people
University of Miami alumni
Place of birth missing (living people)
Writers from Florida